GURPS Middle Ages I is a sourcebook for running a Middle Ages themed GURPS campaign. It is a part of the extensive GURPS "generic" roleplaying system.

Contents
GURPS Middle Ages I covers English history from the Dark Ages to the Renaissance, and addresses such topics as the development of Saxon law, the influence of the Celtic church, and the ramifications of the Hundred Years' War. A chapter on spellcasting
provides simple rules for rune magic and Hellenistic charms. The "Medieval Bestiary" compiles background notes and GURPS statistics for mythological creatures relevant to the era.

Publication history
GURPS Middle Ages I was designed by Graeme Davis and Michael Hurst, and edited by Steve Jackson, and published by Steve Jackson Games as a 128-page softcover book. Illustrations are by Ruth Thompson, Carl Anderson, Thomas Baxa, Angela Bostick, Dan Carroll, Evan Dorkin, Rick Lowry, and Rob Prior, with a cover by Rowena. After the Secret Service raid on SJG, the company stopped printing adventures for financial reasons, and as a result put out standalone GURPS books; this included more historical subgenre books such as GURPS Middle Ages I, a genre that had been notably missing before that point. As of 2002 it is in its second edition.

Reception
Rick Swan reviewed GURPS Middle Ages I for Dragon magazine #190 (February 1993). He notes that although "the fantasy elements are well-chosen, the straight history makes for the most provocative reading" but concludes that "despite the meticulous research, the book's lack of focus often makes for a tough ride. In most cases, the material is assigned to neat, discrete compartments. History goes over here, fantasy stays over there, and rarely do the designers make an effort to show how the two complement each other. The perfunctory campaigning chapter provides broad suggestions for designing adventures but few usable specifics. Though the book presents a river of information, it's up to the referee to sift the gold from the silt."

References

External links
IN GENRE: Epic Fantasy RPG.net article with suggestions for running an Epic Fantasy campaign, including GURPS and other systems

2002 books
Middle Ages I
Historical role-playing games
Role-playing game supplements introduced in 1992